Youghal was a parliamentary borough represented in the Irish House of Commons until its abolition on 1 January 1801. It was a corporation with burgesses and freemen.

History
In 1700 the borough was under the patronage of Charles Boyle, 2nd Earl of Burlington. It passed through his granddaughter Charlotte Cavendish, Marchioness of Hartington to her husband William Cavendish, later Duke of Devonshire, who by 1758 had entrusted it to Henry Boyle, 1st Earl of Shannon. Following the Act of Union 1800 the borough sent one MP to Westminster, still under the patronage of the Earls of Shannon.

A Topographical Directory of Ireland, published in 1837, describes the parliamentary history of the borough of Youghal in County Cork:

Members of Parliament 1559–1801

Elections
1613 June 7 Edmund Coppinger 62 votes; John Forrest 53; Thomas Ronayne 12; Henry Gosnold 6.
1628 October 9 William Bluet and Edward Gough returned.
1634 June/July Edward Gough  59; Theobald Ronane 41; Edward Stoute 21; Christmas Harford 5.
1639 February 25 Edward Gough 51; Theobald Ronaine 44; William Gough (son of Richard) 21; Nicholas Forest 10.
1695
1703
1713
1715
1719 July 20 (by-election on the death of Francis Palmes) Henry Rugge 88 votes; Sir John Osberne, baronet, 60.
1727
1761
1768
1776
1783
1790
1797
1800 January Robert Uniacke re-elected after appointment as Master General of the Ordnance of Ireland.

References

Sources
 
 T. W. Moody, F. X. Martin, F. J. Byrne, A New History of Ireland 1534-1691, Oxford University Press, 1978
 Tim Cadogan and Jeremiah Falvey, A Biographical Dictionary of Cork, 2006, Four Courts Press

Citations

Constituencies of the Parliament of Ireland (pre-1801)
Historic constituencies in County Cork
Youghal
1374 establishments in Ireland
1800 disestablishments in Ireland
Constituencies established in 1374
Constituencies disestablished in 1800